The United States national professional ballroom dance champions are crowned at the United States Dance Championships (formerly USBC and USDSC), as recognized by the National Dance Council of America (NDCA) and the World Dance & DanceSport Council (WD&DSC).

The International Latin division consists of International-style cha cha, samba, rumba, paso doble, and jive.

U.S. National Champions

See also 
U.S. National Dancesport Champions (Professional Standard)
U.S. National Dancesport Champions (Professional Smooth)
U.S. National Dancesport Champions (Professional Rhythm)
U.S. National Dancesport Champions (Professional 10-Dance)
U.S. National Dancesport Champions (Professional 9-Dance)
Dancesport World Champions (Latin)

References

External links 
United States Dance Sport Championships (USDSC)
National Dance Council of America (NDCA)
Dancesport Competitions
Dancesport Info

Dancesport in the United States
Latin dances